West Virginia Route 31 is a north–south state highway in the northwestern portion of the U.S. state of West Virginia. The northern terminus of the route is at the Ohio state line on the Williamstown Bridge over the Ohio River. The southern terminus is at West Virginia Route 16 in Harrisville, West Virginia.

The northernmost extent of the route from West Virginia Route 14 near Interstate 77 Exit 185 southeast of Williamstown to the Ohio state line is not signed.

Major intersections

References

031
Transportation in Ritchie County, West Virginia
Transportation in Wood County, West Virginia